MU Legend is a massively multiplayer online action role-playing game (MMOARPG). It is based on the 2001 game MU Online as well as MU Origin.

Like its predecessor, MU Legend is developed by the Korean gaming company Webzen Games. The title has been under development for quite some time - first rumors about it appeared in 2004 and its development was held back until 2009. MU2's debut trailer was showcased at the G-Star 2011 Expo in Busan on November 10, 2011. The game is based on Unreal Engine 3 and shares familiar features with Mu Online as distinctive UI and controls. On September 23, 2015 official Korean site was updated with teaser page. MU 2 has been renamed to MU Legend. On October 25, 2016 MU Legend starts its global release with a first closed beta test.

See also
 Webzen Games
 Mu Online
 List of Unreal Engine games

References

External links
 MU Legend's Official Website

Massively multiplayer online role-playing games
2017 video games
Unreal Engine games
Video games scored by Jesper Kyd
Video games developed in South Korea
Video game sequels
Windows games
Windows-only games
Video games with stereoscopic 3D graphics
Webzen games
Action role-playing video games